Florence Ekpo-Umoh (born 27 December 1977 in Lagos) is a Nigerian-German sprinter, who specializes in the 400 m. She was suspended from competing for two years for doping.

Career 
Ekpo-Umoh last competed for her birth country Nigeria at the 1994 World Junior Championships. She defected to Germany in 1995 during a training camp there, married her German trainer in 1998 and received German citizenship in 2000. Since 1998, she represented the sports club USC Mainz.

In 2003, Ekpo-Umoh was found guilty of stanozolol doping. The sample was delivered on 24 January 2003 in an out-of-competition test in South Africa. She was suspended from the sport until March 2005.

Her personal best time is 51.13 seconds, achieved in June 2001 in Stuttgart.

Achievements

See also
List of sportspeople sanctioned for doping offences

References

2008 Official Beijing Olympics profile : Ekpo-Umoh, Florence

1977 births
Living people
Nigerian female sprinters
German female sprinters
Athletes (track and field) at the 2000 Summer Olympics
Athletes (track and field) at the 2008 Summer Olympics
Olympic athletes of Germany
Nigerian emigrants to Germany
German sportspeople of Nigerian descent
Naturalized citizens of Germany
Sportspeople from Lagos
Doping cases in athletics
German sportspeople in doping cases
World Athletics Championships medalists
European Athletics Championships medalists
World Athletics Indoor Championships medalists
Olympic female sprinters